Sebastião Martins Oliveira Júnior (born 7 February 1972), commonly known as Arzul, is a Brazilian retired footballer who played as a goalkeeper, and is the goalkeeping coach of Santos.

Career
Born in Santos, São Paulo, Arzul represented Portuguesa Santista and Juventus-SP as a youth; initially a centre forward, he was converted into a goalkeeper after arriving late to a training session. After impressing in his new position, he was nicknamed Arzul due to his physical likeness to Julio César Arzú, a goalkeeper of Honduras in the 1982 FIFA World Cup.

Arzul made his senior debut with Juventus in 1990, also playing in the year's Série B. He subsequently played for Paulista and Guarujá before switching to futsal.

Arzul joined Santos' futsal side in 1998, and started his coaching career in the following year, being a goalkeeping coach of the youth futsal categories. He retired in 2000 after knee injuries, and moved back to football under the same coaching role.

Arzul was promoted as the main squad's goalkeeping coach in 2009 by manager Vanderlei Luxemburgo. In 2020, after completing 22 years in the club, he was inducted to be included in the club's Wall of Fame, painted in the outside of the CT Rei Pelé, where other club idols were included.

References

1972 births
Living people
Sportspeople from Santos, São Paulo
Association football goalkeepers
Brazilian footballers
Campeonato Brasileiro Série B players
Associação Atlética Portuguesa (Santos) players
Clube Atlético Juventus players
Paulista Futebol Clube players
Brazilian men's futsal players
Santos FC non-playing staff